Nelsia is a genus of flowering plants belonging to the family Amaranthaceae. It is with the Amaranthoideae subfamily.

It is native to Angola, Botswana and Namibia.

The genus name of Nelsia is in honour of Louis Nels (1855–1910), a German government official who served as acting Reichskommissar in German South West Africa in 1890–1891. It was first described and published in Vierteljahrsschr. Naturf. Ges. Zürich Vol.56 on page 247 in 1911.

Known species
Acccording to Kew:
Nelsia angolensis 
Nelsia quadrangula 
Nelsia tropidogyna

References

Amaranthaceae
Amaranthaceae genera
Plants described in 1911
Flora of Angola
Flora of Botswana
Flora of Namibia